The Mam are an indigenous people in the western highlands of Guatemala and in south-western Mexico who speak the Mam language.

Most Mam (617,171) live in Guatemala, in the departments of Huehuetenango, San Marcos, and Quetzaltenango. The Mam people in Mexico (23,632) live principally in the Soconusco region of Chiapas.

In pre-Columbian times the Mam were part of the Maya civilization; the pre-Columbian capital of the Mam kingdom was Zaculeu.

Many Mam live in and around the nearby modern city of Huehuetenango. The city of Quetzaltenango or Xela was originally Mam. Many more Mam live in small hamlets in the mountains of northern Guatemala, keeping many of their native traditions. Many Mam are bilingual and speak both Spanish as well as the Mam language, part of the Maya language family, the latter typically as their first language.

See also
Mam (Maya mythology)
Kayb'il B'alam
Tecun Uman
Takalik Abaj

References

External links
A traditional Mayan horse race for the Todos Santos Mam Holiday
Two Crosses of Todos Santos An anthropological study of the village focusing on religious ritual

Maya peoples of Guatemala
Huehuetenango Department
Quetzaltenango Department
San Marcos Department
Maya peoples of Mexico
Mesoamerican cultures